Carteroniella is a monotypic genus of African sac spiders containing the single species, Carteroniella macroclava. It was first described by Embrik Strand in 1907, and has only been found in South Africa. , the genus is considered a nomen dubium by the World Spider Catalog.

References

Endemic fauna of South Africa
Clubionidae
Monotypic Araneomorphae genera
Spiders of South Africa
Taxa named by Embrik Strand